Pop 'til You Drop! is the third studio album by Swedish pop group A-Teens, released in 2002 exclusively for the U.S. market. Recorded between 2001 and 2002 in Stockholm, Sweden, Pop 'til You Drop! provide a more American-driven sound rather than just Europop. For the first time, the A-Teens participated on the writing of the tracks and the design of the album and image. It was released as an American only release on June 18, 2002, in the hype of the promotion of the first single, a cover of Elvis Presley's "Can't Help Falling in Love", which was part of Lilo & Stitch's soundtrack. The album also consists of five new previously unreleased songs, along with six songs later released on their third full-length studio album New Arrival, with School's Out having an early altered version with a lightly different ending on this album in contrast to the New Arrival version. The group's cover of "This Year" by Chantal Kreviazuk later appeared on the Kim Possible's soundtrack.

The album peaked at #45 on the Billboard charts after their first headlining tour in the United States.

Soon after, the album was released in Mexico, Argentina and other countries in Asia and Latin-America.

The album spawned one more hit single "Floorfiller". Both "Floorfiller" and "Can't Help Falling in Love" were released in Europe despite that the album was never released there (although many import copies were available). Some promo copies of the album that were released in the United States included the bonus track "Have a Little Faith in Me" but this track was never commercially released until 2003 when their fourth (and final) album New Arrival was released.

Track listing

Credits 
A*Teens
Marie Serneholt - vocals
Sara Lumholdt - vocals
Dhani Lennevald - vocals
Amit Paul - vocals

Guest/session musicians
Mats Berntoft - guitar
Peter Björklund - backing vocals
Melody Chambers - backing vocals
Alice Cooper - guest vocals (12)
David Eriksen - keyboards
Uno Forsberg - trumpet
Johan Håkansson - saxophone (alto, baritone)
Mats Johansson	- guitar
Kristina Johnsson - backing vocals
Thomas Lindberg - bass
Tobias Lindell - beats
Esbjörn Öhrwall - guitar
Jeanette Olsson - backing vocals
Børge Petersen-Øverlier - guitar
Andrew Ramsey - guitar (acoustic, electric)
RedOne - guitar, multi-instruments, backing vocals
Anna Sahlin - backing vocals
Markus Sigvardsson - bass
Tomas Sjögren - trumpet
Magnus Strömberg - piano
Odile Tuniche - percussion
Tysper - backing vocals

Crew
Stefan Åberg - mixing
Leah Andreone - composer
Peter Björklund - arranger, mixing, producer
Peter Boström - engineer, mixing, producer
Michael Bruce - composer (12)
Glen Buxton - composer (12)
Melody Chambers - vocal arrangement
Alice Cooper - composer (12)
Becky Corcoran - vocal arrangement
Luigi Creatore - composer
Dave Dillbeck - (digital) editing
Dennis Dunaway - composer (12)
Bjorn Engelmann - mastering
David Eriksen - arranger, composer, engineer, producer, programming
Marti Frederiksen - composer
Grizzly - composer
Mark Hammond - arranger, producer, programming, vocal arrangement
Patrik Henzel - mixing
Bill Importico - mixing
Anders Johansson & Nuthouse - A&R
Raz Kennedy - vocal producer, vocal production assistance
Tobias Lindell - arranger, mixing, producer
Tomas Ljung - vocal engineer
Christer Mellstrom - production coordination
Chris Nelson - engineer, mixing, producer
Tom Nichols - composer (10)
Bridgett Evans O'Lannerghty - production coordination
Mats Oscarsson - photography
Hugo Peretti - composer
RedOne - composer, engineer, producer
Rob 'n' Raz - engineer
Dan Shike - assistant
F. Reid Shippen - mixing
Neal Smith - composer (12)
Billy Steinberg - composer (5)
Magnus Strömberg - string arrangements
Fredrik Thomander - composer
The Tremolo Beer Gut - composer
Tysper - arranger, engineer, horn arrangements, mixing, multi-instruments, producer
George David Weiss - composer

Weekly charts

References 

A-Teens albums
Albums produced by RedOne
2002 albums